Chilhowie Methodist Episcopal Church, also known as Chilhowie United Methodist Church, is a historic Methodist Episcopal church located at Chilhowie, Smyth County, Virginia. It was built in 1893–1894, and is a cruciform plan, golden brown brick, Late Gothic Revival-style church.  It has a gable roof and a central front projecting bell tower.  The church features lancet windows, a stained glass rose window, and a vaulted ceiling.

It was listed on the National Register of Historic Places in 1991.

References

Churches on the National Register of Historic Places in Virginia
Gothic Revival church buildings in Virginia
Churches completed in 1894
Buildings and structures in Smyth County, Virginia
National Register of Historic Places in Smyth County, Virginia